Nanustes fuchsi is a species of beetle in the family Cerambycidae, the only species in the genus Nanustes.

References

Acanthocinini